Zero Day is a thriller novel written by David Baldacci. It is the first installment in the John Puller book series. The book was initially published on November 16, 2011, by Grand Central Publishing.

References

External links

2011 American novels
Novels by David Baldacci
Grand Central Publishing books